Jampatong Na Nontachai is a Thai former Muay Thai fighter who fought in the 70s to 90s. He was a Rajadamnern Stadium Champion with notable wins over Saencherng Pinsinchai, Sangtiennoi Sor.Rungroj, Chamuekpet Hapalang, and Samart Payakaroon.

Career and biography 
Jampatong was born in Ratchaburi Province, Thailand. He started Boxing at a young age as a means to help his family.

Early in his career, in June 1979, he gained two decision victories over Samart Payakaroon. In their third fight, due to Jampatong severely underperforming, the referee called a No contest.

In 1985, Jampatong won his first and last major title as he knocked out Sangtiennoi Sor.Rungroj with his signature high kick.

In 1986, he was a front runner for the Sports Writers Association of Thailand Fighter of the Year award but narrowly lost to Panomtuanlek Hapalang, the man who would take away Jampatong's Rajadamnern Stadium title later in that same year. In this year, he gained a shock upset win over Chamuekpet Hapalang as Jampatong knocked him out in the second round with his signature high kick.

Jampatong dove into a slump late in 1986 as he picked up losses against Jomwo Chuanyim, lost his Rajadamnern Stadium title to Panomtuanlek Hapalang.

In 1987, he suffered two of his worst defeats. In March, he was knocked out by a high kick against Suphaphet Kiatdipetnoi. In August, he was given another shot at the Rajadamnern Stadium title against former Lumpinee Stadium Champion, Yodpetch Sor.Chipattana. Jampatong was knocked out only 31 seconds into the fight.

Ultimately, Jampatong had many wins against legendary fighters, and though his prime was short-lived, he leaves behind a very strong legacy.

Today, the former Yodmuay runs a noodle shop in Nonthaburi.

In June 2021, Sylvie von Duuglas-Ittu and her husband got in touch with Jampatong and filmed a long session with him for their Muay Thai Library  at Jitmuangnon gym. It was the first time he had stepped into a ring in over 20 years.

Titles 

 Rajadamnern Stadium Bantamweight (118 lbs) Champion

Fight record 

|- style="background:#fbb;"
|1990-06-07
|Loss
| align="left" | Nuengsiam Kiatwichian
|Lumpinee Stadium
|Bangkok, Thailand
|Decision
|5
|3:00
|- style="background:#cfc;"
|1990-03-29
|Win
| align="left" | Wanpichit Kaennorasing
|Lumpinee Stadium
|Bangkok, Thailand
|TKO (referee stoppage)
|4
|
|- style="text-align:center; background:#cfc;"
|1990-02-19
|Win
| align="left" | Den Sahakanosot
|Rajadamnern Stadium
|Bangkok, Thailand
|Decision
|5
|3:00

|- style="background:#fbb;"
|1989-12-06
|Loss
| align="left" | Taweechai Wor.Preecha
|Rajadamnern Stadium
|Bangkok, Thailand
|KO
|2
|
|- style="text-align:center; background:#cfc;"
|1989-11-13
|Win
| align="left" | Khunpon Chor.Rotchanachai
|Rajadamnern Stadium
|Bangkok, Thailand
|Decision
|5
|3:00

|- style="background:#fbb;"
|1989-
|Loss
| align="left" | Buranachai Tor.Tuwanon
|
|Pattaya, Thailand
|Decision
|5
|3:00

|- style="background:#fbb;"
|1989-07-27
|Loss
| align="left" | Kwangthong Kilenthong
|Rajadamnern Stadium
|Bangkok, Thailand
|Decision
|5
|3:00

|- style="background:#cfc;"
|1989-
|Win
| align="left" | Manachai Na Patayya
|Rajadamnern Stadium
|Bangkok, Thailand
|Decision
|5
|3:00

|- style="background:#cfc;"
|1989-05-13
|Win
| align="left" | Khunpon Chor.Rotchanachai
|Lumpinee Stadium
|Bangkok, Thailand
|Decision
|5
|3:00

|- style="background:#cfc;"
|1989-04-17
|Win
| align="left" | Phetkasem Yuthakit
|Rajadamnern Stadium
|Bangkok, Thailand
|Decision
|5
|3:00

|- style="background:#fbb;"
|1989-
|Loss
| align="left" | Phetkasem Yuthakit
|Rajadamnern Stadium
|Bangkok, Thailand
|Decision
|5
|3:00

|- style="background:#fbb;"
|1988-12-
|Loss
| align="left" | Kwangthong Kilenthong
|Rajadamnern Stadium
|Bangkok, Thailand
|KO
|1
|
|- style="background:#fbb;"
|1988-11-10
|Loss
| align="left" | Chokdee Kiatpayathai
|Rajadamnern Stadium
|Bangkok, Thailand
|Decision
|5
|3:00

|- style="background:#cfc;"
|1988-10-06
|Win
| align="left" | Lukchang sitchang 
|Rajadamnern Stadium
|Bangkok, Thailand
|KO
|3
|
|- style="background:#fbb;"
|1988-
|Loss
| align="left" | Sodsai kiatchaiyong
|Rajadamnern Stadium
|Bangkok, Thailand
|Decision
|5
|3:00

|- style="background:#cfc;"
|1988-08-04
|Win
| align="left" | Roengnoi Chomphuthong
|Rajadamnern Stadium
|Bangkok, Thailand
|KO (punches)
|5
|
|- style="background:#cfc;"
|1988-
|Win
| align="left" | Phetkasem Yuthakit
|Rajadamnern Stadium
|Bangkok, Thailand
|KO
|4
|
|- style="background:#fbb;"
|1988-05-05
|Loss
| align="left" | Kwangthong Kilenthong
|Rajadamnern Stadium
|Bangkok, Thailand
|Decision
|5
|3:00

|- style="background:#fbb;"
|1988-02-17
|Loss
| align="left" | Wanpichit Kaennorasing
|Rajadamnern Stadium
|Bangkok, Thailand
|Decision
|5
|3:00
|- style="background:#fbb;"
|1987-11-17
|Loss
| align="left" | Grandprixnoi MuangChaiyapum
|Lumpinee Stadium
|Bangkok, Thailand
|Decision
|5
|3:00
|- style="background:#fbb;"
|1987-10-26
|Loss
| align="left" | Roengchai Thairungruang
|Lumpinee Stadium
|Bangkok, Thailand
|Decision
|5
|3:00
|- style="background:#fbb;"
|1987-08-25
|Loss
| align="left" | Yodpetch Sor.Chipattana
|Lumpinee Stadium
|Bangkok, Thailand
|KO
|1
|0:31
|-
! colspan="8" style="background:white" |
|- style="background:#cfc;"
|1987-07-23
|Win
| align="left" | Kongnapa Luktabfa
|Rajadamnern Stadium
|Bangkok, Thailand
|Decision
|5
|3:00
|- style="background:#cfc;"
|1987-05-20
|Win
| align="left" | Kengkajnoi Kiatniwat
|Rajadamnern Stadium
|Bangkok, Thailand
|KO (High kick)
|5
|2:35
|- style="background:#cfc;"
|1987-04-17
|Win
| align="left" | Grandprixnoi Muangchaiyaphum
|Rajadamnern Stadium
|Bangkok, Thailand
|Decision
|3
|3:00
|- style="background:#fbb;"
|1987-03-12
|Loss
| align="left" | Suphaphet Kiatdiphetnoi
|Rajadamnern Stadium
|Bangkok, Thailand
|KO (right high kick)
|
|
|- style="background:#fbb;"
|1987-01-29
|Loss
| align="left" | Sombat Sor.Thanikul
|Rajadamnern Stadium
|Bangkok, Thailand
|Decision
|5
|3:00
|- style="background:#c5d2ea;"
|1986-12-25
|Draw
| align="left" | Jomwo Sakniran
|Rajadamnern Stadium
|Bangkok, Thailand
|Decision
|5
|3:00

|- style="background:#fbb;"
|1986-10-29
|Loss
| align="left" | Panomtuanlek Hapalang
|Rajadamnern Stadium
|Bangkok, Thailand
|Decision
|5
|3:00
|-
|- style="background:#fbb;"
|1986-09-25
|Loss
| align="left" | Panomtuanlek Hapalang
|Rajadamnern Stadium
|Bangkok, Thailand
|Decision
|5
|3:00
|-
! colspan="8" style="background:white" |
|- style="background:#fbb;"
|1986-09-05
|Loss
| align="left" | Chamuakpet Hapalang
|Rajadamnern Stadium
|Bangkok, Thailand
|Decision
|5
|3:00
|- style="background:#fbb;"
|1986-07-10
|Loss
| align="left" | Jomwo Chuanyim
|Rajadamnern Stadium
|Bangkok, Thailand
|Decision
|5
|3:00
|- style="background:#cfc;"
|1986-06-12
|Win
| align="left" | Chamuakpet Hapalang
|Rajadamnern Stadium
|Bangkok, Thailand
|KO (right high kick)
|2
|
|- style="text-align:center; background:#cfc;"
|1986-04-23
|Win
| align="left" | Saencherng Pinsinchai
|Rajadamnern Stadium
|Bangkok, Thailand
|KO (left high kick)
|2
|
|- style="text-align:center; background:#cfc;"
|1986-03-17
|Win
| align="left" | Sangtiennoi Sitsurapong
|Rajadamnern Stadium
|Bangkok, Thailand
|Decision
|5
|3:00
|- style="background:#cfc;"
|1985-12-12
|Win
| align="left" | Longkrung Kiatkriangkrai
|Rajadamnern Stadium
|Bangkok, Thailand
|Decision (Unanimous)
|3
|3:00
|-
! colspan="8" style="background:white" |
|-
|- style="background:#c5d2ea;"
|1985-10-31
|Draw
| align="left" | Singdam Sakprayuth
|Rajadamnern Stadium
|Bangkok, Thailand
|Decision
|5
|3:00
|- style="background:#fbb;"
|1985-09-23
|Loss
| align="left" | Manasak Sor Ploenchit
|Rajadamnern Stadium
|Bangkok, Thailand
|Decision
|5
|3:00
|- style="background:#cfc;"
|1985-09-05
|Win
| align="left" | Boonnum Sor.Jarunee
|Rajadamnern Stadium
|Bangkok, Thailand
|KO (High Kick)
|2
|
|- style="text-align:center; background:#cfc;"
|1985-08-05
|Win
| align="left" | Sangtiennoi Sitsurapong
|Rajadamnern Stadium
|Bangkok, Thailand
|KO  (left high kick)
|3
|
|-
! colspan="8" style="background:white" |
|- style="background:#cfc;"
|1985-06-13
|Win
| align="left" | Jack Kiatniwat
|Rajadamnern Stadium
|Bangkok, Thailand
|Decision
|5
|3:00
|- style="background:#fbb;"
|1985-05-14
|Loss
| align="left" | Phanmongkon Hor.Mahachai
|Lumpinee Stadium
|Bangkok, Thailand
|Decision
|5
|3:00
|- style="background:#cfc;"
|1985-03-
|Win
| align="left" | Rungchai Thairungruang
|Rajadamnern Stadium
|Bangkok, Thailand
|Decision
|5
|3:00
|- style="background:#cfc;"
|1985-01-
|Win
| align="left" | Phanmongkon Hor.Mahachai
|Rajadamnern Stadium
|Bangkok, Thailand
|Decision
|5
|3:00
|- style="background:#cfc;"
|1984-12-26|| Win || align="left" | Nakhonpathom Pinsinchai ||  ||Bangkok, Thailand || Decision || 5||3:00
|- style="background:#cfc;"
|1984-11-22|| Win || align="left" | Jack Kiatniwat|| Rajadamnern Stadium ||Bangkok, Thailand || Decision || 5||3:00
|- style="background:#cfc;"
|1984-04-19|| Win || align="left" | Lankrung Kiattikriangkrai ||  ||Bangkok, Thailand || Decision || 5||3:00
|- style="background:#cfc;"
|1983-09-30|| Win || align="left" | Phanomnoi Lukprabat || Lumpinee Stadium ||Bangkok, Thailand || KO (High kick) || 2||

|- style="background:#cfc;"
|1983-04-14|| Win || align="left" | Seeoui Sor.Thanikul || Rajadamnern Stadium ||Bangkok, Thailand || Decision || 5||3:00

|- style="background:#cfc;"
|1982-06-29|| Win|| align="left" | Saengphet Lukphaiom||  ||Thailand || Decision || 5||3:00

|- style="background:#fbb;"
|1982-03-13|| Loss|| align="left" | Saengphet Lukphaiom||  ||Chanthaburi province, Thailand || Referee stoppage|| 5||

|- style="background:#cfc;"
|1982-02-16|| Win || align="left" | Srimuang Singsuanngern || Lumpinee Stadium ||Bangkok, Thailand || Decision || 5||3:00

|- style="background:;"
|1981-12-17|| || align="left" | Nungsakon || Samrong Stadium ||Bangkok, Thailand || Decision || 5||3:00

|- style="background:#cfc;"
|1981-04-20|| Win || align="left" | Maewnoi Singkhawat || Lumpinee Stadium ||Bangkok, Thailand || Decision || 5||3:00

|- style="background:#c5d2ea;"
|1980-09-05
|No Contest
| align="left" | Samart Payakaroon
|Lumpinee Stadium
|Bangkok, Thailand
|Referee stoppage
|4
|3:00
|-  style="text-align:center; background:#fbb;"
| 1980-05-13|| Loss||align=left| Paruhatlek Sitchunthong || Lumpinee Stadium || Bangkok, Thailand || KO || 5 ||

|- style="background:#fbb;"
|1980-04-28|| Loss || align="left" | Poonlap Sakniran || Rajadamnern Stadium ||Bangkok, Thailand || Decision || 5||3:00

|-  style="text-align:center; background:#cfc;"
| 1979-11-09|| Win ||align=left| Damrongsak Sor Thanikul || Lumpinee Stadium || Bangkok, Thailand || Decision|| 5 ||3:00

|- style="background:#fbb;"
|1979-10-02
|Loss
| align="left" | Kongsamut Sor.Thanikul
|Lumpinee Stadium
|Bangkok, Thailand
|Decision
|5
|3:00

|- style="background:#fbb;"
|1979-08-17
|Loss
| align="left" | Kongsamut Sor.Thanikul
|Lumpinee Stadium
|Bangkok, Thailand
|Decision
|5
|3:00

|-  style="text-align:center; background:#cfc;"
| 1979-07-24|| Win||align=left| Paruhatlek Sitchunthong || Lumpinee Stadium || Bangkok, Thailand || Decision || 5 ||3:00

|- style="background:#cfc;"
|1979-06-26
|Win
| align="left" | Samart Payakaroon
|Lumpinee Stadium
|Bangkok, Thailand
|Decision
|5
|3:00
|- style="background:#cfc;"
|1979-06-08
|Win
| align="left" | Samart Payakaroon
|Lumpinee Stadium
|Bangkok, Thailand
|Decision
|5
|3:00
|- style="background:#cfc;"
|1979-04-20
|Win
| align="left" | Meownoi Singchaprawat
|Lumpinee Stadium
|Bangkok, Thailand
|Decision
|5
|3:00
|-
|- style="background:#cfc;"
|1979-02-27
|Win
| align="left" | Supakiat Ekayothin
|Lumpinee Stadium
|Bangkok, Thailand
|Decision
|5
|3:00
|-  style="text-align:center; background:#fbb;"
| 1979-01-13|| Loss||align=left| Paruhatlek Sitchunthong || Lumpinee Stadium || Bangkok, Thailand || Decision || 5 ||3:00
|- style="background:#fbb;"
|
|Loss
| align="left" | Thaninoi Sakniran
|Lumpinee Stadium
|Bangkok, Thailand
|Decision
|5
|3:00
|-
| colspan=9| Legend:

References 

1962 births
Living people
Jampatong Na Nontachai
Bantamweight kickboxers
Jampatong Na Nontachai